The FIBA EuroBasket All-Time leaders in games played are the basketball players with the most games played at the FIBA EuroBasket.

All-time leaders in games played
Counting all games played through the end of EuroBasket 2017

See also 
 FIBA EuroBasket
 FIBA EuroBasket MVP
 FIBA EuroBasket All-Tournament Team
 FIBA World Cup
 FIBA World Cup Records
 FIBA Basketball World Cup Most Valuable Player
 FIBA Basketball World Cup All-Tournament Team
 FIBA's 50 Greatest Players (1991)

References

External links 
 
 

EuroBasket
games